War Master is the third album by British death metal band Bolt Thrower. It was recorded at Slaughterhouse studios in September 1990 and produced by Bolt Thrower and Colin Richardson. It was released on Earache Records: Mosh 29 in 1991.

Whereas Realm of Chaos was dominated by grindcore based blasts and riffs, this album abandons most of the grindcore influences for a sound that is more strictly death metal. Moreover, there is more melody in the music and the guitar solos, although some chaotic solos remain. This is also the final Bolt Thrower album to feature the blast beat style of drumming (which can be heard on four songs - "Unleashed (Upon Mankind)", "What Dwells Within", "War Master", and "Afterlife"), before it was abandoned and subsequently never used thereafter in the Bolt Thrower discography.

"Cenotaph" is a thematic continuation of the song "World Eater" from the previous record. The closing riff from "World Eater" is the same as the opening riff from "Cenotaph" and also used in "Embers" from The IVth Crusade, “Powder Burns” from Mercenary and "The Killchain" from Those Once Loyal.

The album was extensively sampled on Dutch breakcore producer Bong-Ra's album Full Metal Racket, with allusions also including song titles such as "Bloody Cenotaph" and "Jo Bench".

Track listing
All songs written by Bolt Thrower

Personnel
Bolt Thrower
 Karl Willetts - vocals
 Gavin Ward - guitars
 Barry Thomson - guitars
 Andrew Whale - drums
 Jo Bench - Bass guitar

Production
 Luton Sinfield - Photography
 Pete Knifton & Ian Cooke at Maxjo Graphics - Artwork and design
 Colin Richardson - Producer, Recording

References

1991 albums
Bolt Thrower albums
Combat Records albums
Earache Records albums
Albums produced by Colin Richardson